Tamara Sky (born February 20, 1985) is a Puerto Rican professional disc jockey and model.

Career
Sky was born in San Juan, Puerto Rico. She has been Miss Puerto Rico Bikini.

She was the cover celebrity and centerfold for the April 2006 issue of the Mexican edition of Playboy. Then she was named Playmate of the Month for August 2007 for the United States edition of the magazine.  She was the only Playmate in 2007 to have any pubic hair for her photoshoot.

She was the main DJ for Donald Trump's birthday party at the Trump Taj Mahal in Atlantic City in June 2007 hosted by Carmen Electra.  She has DJ'd the Pamela Anderson hosted Mac Cosmetics Fashion Week launch party in New York and the after party for the J-lo and Marc Anthony concert.  She has appeared on E!'s reality TV show The Girls Next Door, in Miami based magazine Ocean Drive, online dance music magazine Maxumi and as the front-page feature in New York's Missbehave magazine.

Filmography

References

External links
 

1985 births
Living people
2000s Playboy Playmates
Hispanic and Latino American Playboy Playmates
American DJs
21st-century American women